L'Étudiante is a 1988 French romantic comedy film directed by Claude Pinoteau and starring Sophie Marceau, Vincent Lindon and Élisabeth Vitali. Written by Claude Pinoteau and Danièle Thompson, the film is about an ambitious teaching student, busy preparing for her final exams, whose studies are interrupted by a passionate affair with a jazz musician. The film was released to French theaters on 10 October 1988 and sold 1,583,067 admissions in France.

Plot
Twenty-one-year-old Valentine (Sophie Marceau) is a part-time teacher preparing for her all-important final teaching examinations. She meets Edouard (Vincent Lindon), a jazz musician who aspires to be a composer. Despite their different schedules and career agenda, they engage in a passionate affair. Valentine compares her relationship with Edouard to the dry dissertation of Molière's The Misanthrope in her oral exams at the Sorbonne.

Cast
 Sophie Marceau as Valentine Ezquerra
 Vincent Lindon as Ned
 Élisabeth Vitali as Celine
 Jean-Claude Leguay as Charly
 Elena Pompei as Patricia
 Roberto Attias as Philippe
 Brigitte Chamarande as Claire
 Christian Pereira as Serge
 Beppe Chierici as L'appariteur
 Nathalie Mann as Alexandra
 Anne Macina as Laura
 Janine Souchon as La dame au chien
 Virginie Demians
 Hugues Leforestier as Patron du bouchon
 Jacqueline Noëlle
 Marc-André Brunet as Victor

References

External links
 
 

1988 films
French romantic comedy films
1980s French-language films
Films directed by Claude Pinoteau
Films scored by Vladimir Cosma
1980s French films
1988 romantic comedy films